Giovanni Tornabuoni (Republic of Florence, Italy; 22 December 1428—17 April 1497) was an Italian merchant, banker and patron of the arts from Florence.

Biography 
Giovanni's father Francesco Tornabuoni was a successful entrepreneur and in 1427 the sixth largest taxpayer in Florence. His taxable wealth was considerable, 46,320 florins. He had three wives and eight children, of whom the two youngest, Lucrezia and Giovanni Tornabuoni, were the most famous. Lucrezia became famous above all because she married Piero de' Medici in 1444 and became the mother of Lorenzo de' Medici, de facto ruler of Florence in its Renaissance golden age, in 1449. Giovanni Tornabuoni is therefore the uncle of Lorenzo de' Medici.

He had strong connections with the House of Medici, being the brother of Lucrezia Tornabuoni, and therefore Lorenzo il Magnifico's uncle. In 1443 was named director of the branch in Rome, being Leonardo Vernacci the predecessor, as treasurer of Pope Sixtus IV.

Around 1475, Giovanni Tornabuoni commissioned a portrait of his sister by Domenico Ghirlandaio, which is now in the National Gallery of Art in Washington, D.C.

He was also Florentine ambassador in the Papal court in 1480 and 1484, and gonfaloniere di Giustizia in 1482. In 1485 he signed a contract with painter Domenico Ghirlandaio for a grand cycle of frescoes in what was to become the Tornabuoni Chapel in the church of Santa Maria Novella in Florence. Tornabuoni and his wife, Francesca Pitti, are portrayed as donors in the choir wall. He had been already portrayed by Ghirlandaio in the Sistine Chapel in the Vocation of Andrew and Paul.

Giovanni and Lorenzo were probably commissioned for the wedding in 1486 of Giovanni's son Lorenzo to Giovanna of the Albizzi family, and are therefore thought to depict the two on A Young Man Being Introduced to the Seven Liberal Arts.

By 1490, when the large Tornabuoni Chapel fresco cycle by Domenico Ghirlandaio was completed, family members and political allies of the Tornabuoni populate several scenes in considerable numbers, in addition to conventional kneeling portraits of Giovanni Tornabuoni and his wife.

With Lorenzo's death on 8 April 1492, the succession passed to his 20-year-old son Piero di Lorenzo de' Medici (1472–1521). Piero had no talent for running the bank and depended on his secretary and his great-uncle Giovanni Tornabuoni to handle everything. The two mismanaged the bank and balked the new ministro's, Giovambattista Bracci, efforts.

In 1494 Tornabuoni succeeded Francesco Sassetti in the direction of the Medici Bank.

Popular culture 
He is mentioned in the video game Assassin's Creed II as a tutor of protagonist Ezio Auditore.

References 

Businesspeople from Florence
House of Medici
Italian bankers
15th-century people of the Republic of Florence
Medieval bankers
Medieval Italian diplomats
15th-century births
Year of death unknown
1490s deaths
Ambassadors of the Republic of Florence
15th-century Italian businesspeople